KHLL (100.9 FM) is an American radio station broadcasting a Contemporary Christian Music format.  Licensed to Richwood, Louisiana, United States, the station serves the Monroe, Louisiana area, and is owned by Gilliland, Inc.

References

External links
KHLL's official website

Radio stations in Louisiana
Radio stations established in 1995